My Daughter the Flower (lit. "My Daughter Kkotnim") is a South Korean television drama series about a mother and daughter who are not blood related. The series aired on SBS from November 14, 2011 to May 18, 2012 on Mondays to Fridays at 19:20 with 131 episodes. It starred Jin Se-yeon, Jo Min-su, Park Sang-won, Choi Jin-hyuk, Lee Ji-hoon and Son Eun-seo.

Synopsis
Yang Kkot-nim (kkotnim means "flower") is a therapist at a rehabilitation hospital. She is bright and brave, but highly emotional inside. Since her father died, Kkot-nim gets through life with her stepmother Jang Soon-ae, who is always there for her.

Cast
Jin Se-yeon as Yang Kkot-nim
Jo Min-su as Jang Soon-ae
Park Sang-won as Goo Jae-ho
Choi Jin-hyuk as Goo Sang-hyuk
Lee Ji-hoon as Eun Chae-wan
Son Eun-seo as Eun Chae-kyung
Baek Jong-min as Goo Joon-hyuk
Kim Seung-hwan as Joo Yong-pil
Oh Young-shil as Oh Mi-sook
Kim Bo-mi as Joo Hong-dan
Sunwoo Jae-duk as Yang Soo-chul
Yoon So-jung as Moon Jung-ok
Jung Joo-eun as Yoon Hye-jin
Jung Kyu-soo as Eun Chun-man
Lee Jong-nam as Heo Young-ae
Lee Yu-ri (cameo)

Awards
2011 SBS Drama Awards: New Star Award  - Jin Se-yeon

References

External links
My Daughter the Flower official SBS website 

Seoul Broadcasting System television dramas
2011 South Korean television series debuts
2012 South Korean television series endings
Korean-language television shows
South Korean romance television series